The 1938 Cork Intermediate Hurling Championship was the 29th staging of the Cork Intermediate Hurling Championship since its establishment by the Cork County Board in 1909.

Blarney won the championship following a 1-04 to 1-00 defeat of St. Anne's in the final. This was their second championship title overall and their second title in succession.

Results

Final

References

Cork Intermediate Hurling Championship
Cork Intermediate Hurling Championship